The Greene County Nuclear Power Plant was proposed in 1974 by the Power Authority of the State of New York.  A single 1,212 MWe Babcock & Wilcox pressurized water reactor was to be built approximately 5 miles south of Catskill, New York on the western shore of the Hudson River, but the plant proposal was canceled in 1979, largely due to concerns over social and economic disruptions to the local communities.

See also 

 List of books about nuclear issues
 Nuclear power debate
 Nuclear power in the United States
 Somerset Power Plant

References

External links 
 Cancelled Nuclear Units Ordered in the United States 

Cancelled nuclear power stations in the United States
Greene County, New York
Nuclear history of the United States